Six referendums were held in Switzerland in 1980. The first two were held on 2 March on a popular initiative on the complete separation of church and state, which was rejected, and a federal resolution on reorganising national supply, which was approved. The next four were held on 30 November on a federal law requiring the wearing of seat belts and helmets, abolishing the cantonal share of stamp duty, the destination of taxes on spirits and changing regulations on breadstuffs, all of which were approved.

Results

March: Separation of church and state

March: National supply

December: Seat belts and helmets

December: Stamp duty

December: Spirits tax

December: Breadstuffs regulations

References

1980 referendums
1980 in Switzerland
Referendums in Switzerland